The 17th Filmfare Awards were held on May 11, 1970.

Aradhana led the ceremony with 9 nominations, followed by Jeene Ki Raah with 6 nominations.

Anokhi Raat won 4 awards, including Best Screenplay (Hrishikesh Mukherjee) and Best Dialogue (Anand Kumar), thus becoming the most-awarded film at the ceremony.

Rajesh Khanna received dual nominations for Best Actor for his performances in Aradhana and Ittefaq, but lost to Ashok Kumar who won the award for Aashirwaad.

Main Awards

Best Film
 Aradhana 
Aashirwad
Jeene Ki Raah

Best Director
 Yash Chopra – Ittefaq 
L.V. Prasad – Jeene Ki Raah
Shakti Samanta – Aradhana

Best Actor
 Ashok Kumar – Aashirwad 
Rajesh Khanna – Aradhana
Rajesh Khanna – Ittefaq

Best Actress
 Sharmila Tagore – Aradhana 
Asha Parekh – Chirag
Nanda – Ittefaq

Best Supporting Actor
 Pran – Aansoo Ban Gaye Phool 
Ashok Kumar – Aashirwad
Balraj Sahni – Ek Phool Do Mali

Best Supporting Actress
 Tanuja – Paisa Ya Pyaar
Bindu – Ittefaq
Farida Jalal – Aradhana

Best Comic Actor
 Mehmood – Waris 
Johnny Walker – Haseena Maan Jayegi
Mehmood – Meri Bhabhi

Best Story
 Aansoo Ban Gaye Phool – Vasant Kanetkar 
Aashirwad – Hrishikesh Mukherjee
Aradhana – Sachin Bhowmick

Best Screenplay
 Anokhi Raat – Hrishikesh Mukherjee

Best Dialogue
 Anokhi Raat – Anand Kumar

Best Music Director 
 Jeene Ki Raah – Laxmikant–Pyarelal 
Aradhana – S.D. Burman
Chanda Aur Bijli – Shankar-Jaikishan

Best Lyricist
Chanda Aur Bijli – Gopaldas Neeraj for Kal Ka Paiyya Aradhana – Anand Bakshi for Mere Sapno Ki RaniJeene Ki Raah – Anand Bakshi for Badi Mastani HaiBest Playback Singer, Male
 Aradhana – Kishore Kumar for Roop Tera Mastana Chanda Aur Bijli – Manna Dey for Kal Ka PaiyyaJeene Ki Raah – Mohammad Rafi for Badi Mastani HaiBest Playback Singer, Female
 Jeene Ki Raah – Lata Mangeshkar for Aap Mujhe Acche Lagne Lage Inteqam – Lata Mangeshkar for Kaise Rahun ChupChanda Aur Bijli – Sharda for Tere Ang Ka RangBest Art Direction, B&W
 Anokhi Raat – Ajit Banerjee

Best Art Direction, Color
 Tamanna – A.R. Kakkad and Baburao T. Poddar

Best Cinematography, B&W
 Anokhi Raat – Kamal Bose

Best Cinematography, Color
 Duniya – Faredoon Irani

Best Editing
 Nanha Farishta – B. S. Glaad

Best Sound
 Ittefaq – M.A. Shaikh

Critics' Awards
Best Documentary
 Then, The Rain 

Biggest Winners Anokhi Raat – 4/4 Aradhana – 3/9 Ittefaq – 2/5 Jeene Ki Raah – 2/6 Aansoo Ban Gaye Phool – 2/2

See also 19th Filmfare Awards 18th Filmfare Awards Filmfare Awards''

References

https://www.imdb.com/event/ev0000245/1970/

Filmfare Awards
Filmfare
1970 in Indian cinema